Dabydeen is a surname. Notable people with the surname include:

Cyril Dabydeen (born 1945), Canadian writer
David Dabydeen (born 1955), Guyanese writer